Joel Blomqvist (born 10 January 2002) is a Finnish professional ice hockey goaltender.  He currently plays  under contract to Oulun Kärpät in Liiga. He was drafted in the second round of the 2020 NHL Entry Draft by the Pittsburgh Penguins with the 52nd overall pick.

References

External links

2002 births
Living people
Finnish ice hockey goaltenders
Kokkolan Hermes players
Oulun Kärpät players
Pittsburgh Penguins draft picks
People from Nykarleby
Sportspeople from Ostrobothnia (region)
Wilkes-Barre/Scranton Penguins players